Bun Kenny (born 1 June 1990 in Metz) is a Cambodian–French retired tennis player.

Bun has a career high ATP singles ranking of 1080 achieved on 16 July 2012, and a career high ATP doubles ranking of 953 achieved on 29 April 2013.

Playing for Cambodia in Davis Cup, Bun has a W/L record of 23–9.

ATP Challenger and ITF Futures finals

Doubles: 2 (0–2)

External links
 
 
 

1990 births
Living people
Cambodian male tennis players
Sportspeople from Metz
Sportspeople from Phnom Penh
Cambodian people of French descent
French people of Cambodian descent
Tennis players at the 2010 Asian Games
Southeast Asian Games bronze medalists for Cambodia
Southeast Asian Games medalists in tennis
Competitors at the 2011 Southeast Asian Games
Competitors at the 2015 Southeast Asian Games
Asian Games competitors for Cambodia